Baynham is a surname with its origins in the United Kingdom and with the variations of Baynam, Bayham, Bynum, Beniams, and Byneham.

History and origins
The Baynham name can be traced back to the Surname 1380 in the form of Ap Eynon. The name is therefore of Welsh origin. There has been a multitude of nobles who have held the surname, and the name has a Coat of Arms.

Notable people sharing the surname "Baynham"
Albert Baynham, English footballer
Craig Baynham, American Football player
David Baynham (1902–1974), Welsh footballer
John Baynham, MP
Johnny Baynham (1918–1995), Welsh footballer
Peter Baynham, British comedy writer and performer
Ronald Baynham, England football player
Thomas Baynham, High Sheriff of Gloucestershire in 1476

References

External links
https://web.archive.org/web/20080506091311/http://www.thebaynhams.com/Baynham.htm 
Genfiles research on Baynham

Surnames